Jemima Yorke, 2nd Marchioness Grey and Countess of Hardwicke (9 October 1723 – 10 January 1797), was a British peeress.

Life and family
She was a daughter of John Campbell, 3rd Earl of Breadalbane and Holland, and his first wife, Lady Amabel Grey. Her maternal grandparents were Henry Grey, 1st Duke of Kent, and his first wife, the Hon. Jemima Crew.

On 22 May 1740, she married the Hon. Philip Yorke (later 2nd Earl of Hardwicke), and they had two daughters:

Lady Amabel Yorke, 1st Countess de Grey, 5th Baroness Lucas (22 January 1751 –1833), married Alexander Hume-Campbell, Lord Polwarth; no issue.
Lady Mary Jemima Yorke (1757–1830), married Thomas Robinson, 2nd Baron Grantham, and had issue.

On 5 June that year, she succeeded as Marchioness Grey by a special remainder upon the death of her maternal grandfather, the Duke of Kent, who held the title. As she had no male heirs, the title of Marchioness became extinct upon her own death in 1797 while her eldest daughter, Amabel succeeded to the title of 5th Baroness Lucas.  That same daughter was later created Countess de Grey in her own right.

See also
Wrest Park

References

External links

1723 births
1797 deaths
Hereditary women peers
Daughters of Scottish earls
Jemima
Jemima
Hardwicke
Marquesses Grey
Burials at the de Grey Mausoleum (Flitton)
Barons Lucas